Benjamin I (18 January 1871 – 17 February 1946) was Ecumenical Patriarch of Constantinople from 1936 to 1946.

Early life

Benjamin was born as Psomas Sunday on 18 January 1871, in Edremit, Ottoman Empire. From 1889 to 1896, he studied at the Halki seminary.

Career

In 1912, he was appointed as the Metropolitan of Rhodes, in 1914, he was appointed as the Metropolitan of Silybria, and was later moved to the Metropolis of Philippopolis, but was unable to perform his duties due to the outbreak of World War I.

On 18 January 1936, the Holy Synod voted to elevated Benjamin from Metropolitan bishop to Ecumenical Patriarch of Constantinople following the death of Photius II.

Benjamin died in Istanbul on 17 February 1946, after suffering from bronchitis and was succeeded by Maximus V. At the 1946 Greek Orthodox Archdiocese of America national convention, two minutes of silence were given in honor of Benjamin and a delegate from Pope Pius XII attended his funeral.

References

20th-century Ecumenical Patriarchs of Constantinople
1871 births
1946 deaths
Bishops of Nicaea
Orthodox bishops of Rhodes
People from Edremit, Balıkesir